The discography of Panamanian reggaeton singer Flex consists of three studio albums, eight solo singles, one featured single and one EP; collaborations are also included.

Flex released his debut album Te Quiero: Romantic Style In Da World in 2007, with the U.S. Billboard Hot Latin no. 1 debut single "Te Quiero".  It reached number no. 1 in many countries, making his first single to enter on US Billboard Hot 100 at no. 86.  A remix with Belinda was released later for the album's fan edition.  It was released with two other singles, "Escápate" and "Sin Tu Amor". Later, Flex collaborated on Kumbia All Starz' song "Por Ti Baby". In 2009, Flex released his second album La Evolución Romantic Style with his second U.S. Billboard Hot Latin no. 1 single, "Dime Si Te Vas Con Él" followed by "Te Amo Tanto".

In March 2010, Flex released his third album Romantic Style Parte 3: Desde La Esencia. The album features the single "Besos de Amor" featuring Kumbia All Starz member Ricky Rick.

Albums

EPs
2009: AOL Dejando Huellas EP

Singles
The following singles have been released commercially with their respective music videos; this section does not include promotional singles.

Collaborations 
2007 Vete (with Eddie Lover)
2008 Luna (Remix) (with El Artista)
2008 Bésame Otra Vez (with Filthy Rich)
2008 Escúcheme Señora (with Alex Pro)
2008 Amor Letra Por Letra (with Eiza González)
2008 Por Ti Baby (with Kumbia All Starz)
2008 Me Acuerdo (with Vico C) (El show de los sueños)
2008 Sigue Bailando Mi Amor (Remix)  (with El Roockie)
2009 La Múcura (with Yuri)    
2009 Carita Bonita (Remix) (with Erre XI and Pee Wee)
2011 Contestame El Telefono (with Alexis & Fido)
2011 Si Decides Regresar (with Mach, Daddy & El Roockie)
2011 En Silencio (Remix) (with Eddy Lover, Joey Montana, El Rockie, Mr Phillips, Mach And Daddy)

Music videos

References

Discographies of Panamanian artists
Reggaeton discographies